The University of Alaska Museum of the North is a cultural and historical museum on the University of Alaska Fairbanks campus.

Mission
The museum's mission is to acquire, conserve, investigate, and interpret specimens and collections relating to the natural, artistic, and cultural heritage of Alaska and the Circumpolar North. Through education, research, and public exhibits, the museum serves the state, national, and international science programs. The museum develops and uses botanical, geological, zoological, and cultural collections; these collections form the basis for understanding past and present issues unique to the North and meeting the challenges of the future.

Founding and history

The museum, formerly known as the University of Alaska Museum, was housed in what is now known as Signers' Hall for much of its history. It was mandated as part of the original legislation establishing the university in 1917. In 1924, Charles E. Bunnell, then-president of the university, directed Otto Geist to collect items for display in the museum. The museum had no one single location until 1936, when it was housed in Signers' Hall. Before that, the collections were displayed or stored in several locations around the campus.

Over time, the collections overflowed the space, and a capital campaign was begun in 1975 to build a new museum. The campaign was completed in 2001 and the new building opened to the public in late 2005, with some galleries opening in 2006.

In September 2020, the museum became the permanent home of Chris McCandless's final resting place, Bus 142, which had been removed from its previous location along the Stampede Trail in June of that year citing safety issues. The bus will be restored and an outdoor exhibit will be created.

Collections

 Alaska Center for Documentary Film
 Alaska Frozen Tissue Collection
 Arctic Archival Observatory
 Archeology Collections
 Earth Sciences Collection
 Entomology Collection
 Ethnology Collection
 History Collection
 Fine Arts Collection
 Herbarium
 Fish, Amphibian, and Reptile Collections
 Mammal Collection
 Marine Invertebrates Collection
 Bird Collection

See also
J. P. Hubrick (born late 1800s, died 1930), photographer working in McCarthy, Alaska
 Brina Kessel, curator of terrestrial vertebrates, 1972–1990; curator of ornithology, 1990–1997

References

External links
 

1917 establishments in Alaska
Art museums and galleries in Alaska
History museums in Alaska
Museums in Fairbanks North Star Borough, Alaska
Native American museums in Alaska
Natural history museums in Alaska
Science museums in Alaska
Scientific organizations established in 1917
University museums in Alaska
University of Alaska Fairbanks